Vivek Agrawal is a film producer known for producing the National Award-Winning English feature film Land Gold Women (2011). Some of Vivek's other producer credits include Queen (2014), Bombay Velvet (2015), Udta Punjab (2016), Super 30 (2019), 83 (2021), The Girl On the Train (2021), and Vikram Vedha (2022). He has produced the much acclaimed Netflix Original series Sacred Games (2017), producing all eight episodes of Season 1. The crime thriller series is Netflix's first Indian Original show. Vivek has also written and directed Hindi feature film, I See You starring Arjun Rampal.

Background
With over 28 years of experience in translating scripts to screen, Vivek has cultivated

significant depth in both the business and language of cinema. 

Heading Phantom Films over 9 years from 2011 to 2019 and then the production at Reliance Entertainment.Vivek has developed, overseen and produced over 30 feature films and web shows. Vivek has created and implemented standards and procedures that ensure movies and content are made cost effectively by lean and efficient teams. This ability has played a critical role in allowing the company to scale and grow optimally. 

Vivek is passionate about acquiring deep technical and creative knowledge, which allows him to strategically troubleshoot issues during any part of the filmmaking process. His experience as a director makes him an empathetic producer and he is best known for executing complex projects within budgets and timelines. Vivek is organized and detail oriented. His experience with Phantom/Reliance has also made him knowledgeable about corporate governance, IP law, and talent contracting. 

He has successfully produced films of varying scales, both independent and commercial, in various parts of the world. As an independent producer, he has developed the ability to build efficient teams, bringing together people of various skills, have them follow processes and policies based on need and necessity and seamlessly execute each project. 

Born and educated in Mumbai, Vivek has a Bachelor's degree in Accounting and Finance Management. He dropped out of a Masters Program in Economics and Finance to pursue his passion for filmmaking. 

His expertise lies in bringing together new teams together for every project and producing them comfortably in any part of the world. With his technical background, finance education and experience in making films ranging from 2cr -200cr, he is the perfect choice for studios/investors to go to when trying to make the seemingly impossible film.

Land Gold Women
The film was released in India in conjunction with the Movement to End Honour Violence. The film and the movement were created by A Richer Lens,  a company run by Vivek and his wife Avantika Hari Agrawal (Writer / Director), with Vivek serving as its CEO. A Richer Lens operates with offices in Mumbai, Dubai and London.

Land Gold Women has won the following awards:

1. India's National Award 2010 for Best Feature Film in English.2. The Foreign Correspondent Association's Purple Orchid Award for Best Film.3. Best Script/Screenplay (Avantika Hari) Award at the Asian Festival of First Films in 2009.4. The Royal Reel Award for Excellence in Filmmaking at the Canada International Film Festival 2010. 5. The Best of Show Award at The Indie Fest, USA.6. The Best Film (Runner Up) ReelHeART International Film Festival held in Toronto.7. The Best Actor (Narinder Samra) ReelHeART International Film Festival held in Toronto.8. The Best Cinematography (David Rom) ReelHeART International Film Festival held in Toronto.

After premiering in the Indian Panorama section of the International Film Festival of Goa in 2009, which screens 26 of the best films made by Indians in any given year, the film has received numerous nominations in various categories at International film festivals. The soundtrack of the film was nominated for an award at the East End Film Festival in 2010. The film also received a nomination for Best UK Feature for Avantika at the Festival.

Vivek and Avantika got married in 2009 after successfully making Land Gold Women.

International Bollywood
Vivek has produced films all over the globe. He has worked with crew from every continent with productions in England, USA, Africa, Australia, Europe (France, Netherlands, Czech Republic, Poland, Italy, Bulgaria, Switzerland, Hungary, Serbia, Austria, Spain, etc) and the middle East.

Current Projects

References

External links 
  Production Studio website
  Vivek Bajrang Agrawal

Film producers from Mumbai
Living people
1974 births